Sinictinogomphus clavatus, the golden flangetail, is a species of dragonfly in the clubtail family Gomphidae. It is the only species in the genus Sinictinogomphus.

S. clavatus is common over a large range from Nepal to Vietnam and eastern Russia. Its habitat is standing or still (lentic) water.

References

Gomphidae
Insects described in 1775
Taxa named by Johan Christian Fabricius